Matthew Scarlett (born 5 June 1979) is a former Australian rules footballer, who formerly played for the Geelong Football Club in the Australian Football League (AFL).

Scarlett was selected by Geelong with the 45th overall pick in the 1997 AFL Draft under the father-son rule, and made his senior debut for the club in the final round of the 1998 AFL season. Scarlett played predominantly as a fullback, and has garnered a long list of individual accolades. He is a triple premiership player from Geelong's premiership-winning teams of 2007, 2009 and 2011, has won a Carji Greeves Medal and been selected to six All-Australian sides, the most selections for a Geelong player. As well as this, Scarlett has been inducted into the Geelong Football Club Hall of Fame, represented the Victorian state team in the AFL Hall of Fame Tribute Match and represented Australia in International rules football.

Scarlett is currently serving as a development coach with the Geelong Football Club.

Early life 
Matthew Scarlett grew up in Geelong, Victoria, the son of former Geelong Football Club player John Scarlett. Despite this, Scarlett supported Essendon as a child, citing Michael Long and Matthew Lloyd as his favourite players. He was educated at St Joseph's College—the same school as his father—where he played junior football alongside future Geelong teammate Cameron Ling. Scarlett entered the next phase of his junior career when he was selected to play for the Geelong Falcons in the under 18 TAC Cup competition in 1997. His achievements with the Falcons were recognised when he was chosen to play for the Victorian Country representative side at the AFL Under 18 Championships, as well as being selected in the full-back position of the TAC Cup's Team of the Year.

AFL career

1998–1999: Debut and early career
Scarlett was drafted by the Geelong Football Club under the father-son rule with their fourth selection in the 1997 AFL Draft, and was the forty-fifth overall draft pick. He was the club's second father-son recruit of the draft, with Marc Woolnough chosen with the club's second selection. In analysing his drafting, media reports identified Scarlett's strong marking and kicking skills whilst noting his potential as a key defender.

Despite playing in the league's pre-season competition as a back pocket, Scarlett did not make his senior-level debut until the final round of the 1998 AFL season where he was matched up against Essendon full-forward Matthew Lloyd. Geelong won this game by ten points, and although Scarlett himself garnered a respectable six disposals and took two marks, he allowed Lloyd to score six goals – a third of the team's total.

Scarlett did not play again until midway through the following season where he was once again matched against Lloyd. Scarlett later credited these match-ups with Lloyd as assisting his long-term development as a player – acknowledging that it was a challenging start to his career. He made a further four senior appearances during the season, including scoring his first goal in round 17. However the majority of the year was spent playing with the reserves team, where he placed third in the best and fairest.

2000–2002: Establishment in the side
Following his limited playing opportunities in his first two seasons, Scarlett established himself in the senior side during the 2000 AFL season, playing in 21 games. This included his finals debut in Geelong's elimination final against , in which they were ultimately defeated by nine points. This capped off a breakthrough season for Scarlett, scoring two goals, achieving his first match in which he gathered at least ten possessions, and earning an AFL Rising Star nomination. Scarlett played a further 20 games and scored another two goals in 2001, a season in which had three games with 20 or more disposals. He was rewarded for his efforts by finishing runner-up in the club's best and fairest award, the Carji Greeves Medal. He was awarded his first Brownlow Medal votes after achieving 26 possessions in a match against  in round eight. At the conclusion of the season, Scarlett was awarded the club's coach's award, and selected to represent Australia in an International rules football series against Ireland.

2003–2004: Carji Greeves Medal and dual All-Australian selection
His consistent high number of marks was reflected when, at season's end, he was ranked 14th in the league for total marks, having obtained 134 marks throughout the 2003 season. Scarlett's performances throughout the season were recognised when he was awarded the club's best and fairest award, the Carji Greeves Medal, as well as achieving All-Australian honours for the first time in his career, and again representing Australia in International rules football.

Following another season without participation in the finals series, Scarlett and his teammates began their 2004 campaign with an appearance in the pre-season competition final against . During the home-and-away period, Scarlett helped the Cats compile a 15–7 win–loss record to qualify for their first finals series in four years. Geelong progressed to the preliminary finals, before losing to Brisbane for a spot in the 2004 AFL Grand Final. Scarlett made twenty-five appearances in total over the course of the season, participating in every match. His high participation rate was realised when he spent all but three minutes in total of the season's matches on the field. He once again finished the year ranked high within the league for total marks (132), placing equal eleventh. He gathered further individual accolades, finishing runner-up in club best and fairest voting, as well as earning an All-Australian selection for the second-consecutive season.

2005–2006: 100th consecutive match and NAB Cup win
The following year, Geelong again qualified for the finals series after finishing the home-and-away campaign with a 12–10 win–loss record. They progressed through to the semi-finals, before a three-point loss to the Sydney Swans ended their season. Scarlett's consistency, reflected with his appearance in twenty-five games during the year and ranking equal twelfth for total marks within the league (146), was rewarded with a runner-up finishing in the club best and fairest award. Scarlett's consistent appearance within the Geelong side was recognised when he played in his 100th-consecutive game for the club in round 16.

After consecutive appearances in the finals series, Scarlett and Geelong were expected to challenge for the premiership once again in 2006. The club's 2006 campaign began successfully when, captained by Scarlett, they captured the pre-season NAB Cup, winning their first pre-season premiership since 1961. During the season, Scarlett's streak of four consecutive seasons of featuring in every Geelong match was broken following a two-game hiatus in the second and third rounds. Despite this, Scarlett played in 20 of 22 games for the season, including his 150th senior appearance for the club. He had a career-best 34 possessions in round 16, which was a one-point win over the Western Bulldogs, and garnered 13 or more possessions in 17 of his games. However, the Cats only managed to win 10 games throughout the season and missed qualification for the finals series. Scarlett finished the season unusually, playing as a forward in the final two matches, managing three goals for a season-total of four.

2007–2012: Premiership success and retirement

Scarlett helped the Cats finish the home-and-away campaign first on the ladder to win the McClelland Trophy. Geelong progressed through to the 2007 AFL Grand Final, where they defeated Port Adelaide by a record 119 points to capture their first premiership since 1963.

Scarlett played in 24 games for the year and gathered a range of individual accolades. After earning his first premiership medal in the Grand Final victory, where he placed third in the Norm Smith Medal voting after gathering 29 possessions and scoring two behinds, Scarlett also achieved All-Australian honours for the third time in his career. Scarlett also had at least 10 disposals in every match for the season, with nine of these totals above 20.

Scarlett helped the Cats achieve a record-equalling 21-win season and secure the McClelland Trophy for the second successive year in 2008. His standout season was recognised early on when he was selected to play for Victoria in the AFL Hall of Fame Tribute Match, and was later selected to his fourth All-Australian team, again as fullback. Scarlett made his 200th senior appearance for the club in round eighteen against Richmond, surpassing his father's total of 183 games for the club. He also set a career-best total of 14 handpasses in round 16 against the Western Bulldogs, finishing with 32 possessions. Despite having eight games with a minimum of 20 disposals, Scarlett failed to kick a goal for the first time since 2003. Having qualified for the finals series in first position on the ladder, Geelong progressed through to the Grand Final for the second successive season. Scarlett performed consistently, but failed to have a massive impact in the final, gathering 11 disposals and one mark, as well as laying two tackles. However, he did limit Coleman Medallist Lance Franklin to only two goals for the match.

During the 2009 season, Scarlett was placed on Geelong's veteran-list, where half his salary would come outside of the club's salary cap. Scarlett was vital in Geelong's 2009 Grand Final triumph where he produced some magic play with less than five minutes to go, kicking the stationary ball off the ground from the centre square and setting up the match and premiership-winning goal by Paul Chapman. Scarlett retired after Geelong's 2012 season ended with an elimination final loss to Fremantle.

Post-retirement
Following his retirement at the end of 2012, Scarlett joined the Western Bulldogs as a part-time development coach specialising in the development of defenders. He was joined on the coaching team by former teammates Cameron Mooney and Steven King, as well as being reunited with Brendan McCartney, who was an assistant coach for Geelong from 2000 to 2010. Scarlett additionally signed a deal to play in the Geelong Football League for South Barwon in 2013.

In 2016, Scarlett joined the Geelong Cats as an assistant coach. He resigned from the role at the end of the 2021 season.

Statistics

|- style="background-color: #EAEAEA" 
! scope="row" style="text-align:center" | 1998
|style="text-align:center;"|
| 41 || 1 || 0 || 0 || 5 || 1 || 6 || 2 || 1 || 0.0 || 0.0 || 5.0 || 1.0 || 6.0 || 2.0 || 1.0
|-
! scope="row" style="text-align:center" | 1999
|style="text-align:center;"|
| 30 || 5 || 1 || 1 || 15 || 2 || 17 || 9 || 3 || 0.2 || 0.2 || 3.0 || 0.4 || 3.4 || 1.8 || 0.6
|- style="background-color: #EAEAEA" 
! scope="row" style="text-align:center" | 2000
|style="text-align:center;"|
| 30 || 21 || 2 || 0 || 142 || 43 || 185 || 73 || 22 || 0.1 || 0.0 || 6.8 || 2.0 || 8.8 || 3.5 || 1.0
|-
! scope="row" style="text-align:center" | 2001
|style="text-align:center;"|
| 30 || 20 || 2 || 2 || 189 || 87 || 276 || 112 || 33 || 0.1 || 0.1 || 9.4 || 4.4 || 13.8 || 5.6 || 1.6
|- style="background-color: #EAEAEA" 
! scope="row" style="text-align:center" | 2002
|style="text-align:center;"|
| 30 || 22 || 2 || 3 || 171 || 106 || 277 || 85 || 27 || 0.1 || 0.1 || 7.8 || 4.8 || 12.6 || 3.9 || 1.2
|-
! scope="row" style="text-align:center" | 2003
|style="text-align:center;"|
| 30 || 22 || 0 || 2 || 206 || 105 || 311 || 134 || 29 || 0.0 || 0.1 || 9.4 || 4.8 || 14.1 || 6.1 || 1.3
|- style="background-color: #EAEAEA" 
! scope="row" style="text-align:center" | 2004
|style="text-align:center;"|
| 30 || 25 || 3 || 3 || 238 || 96 || 334 || 132 || 42 || 0.1 || 0.1 || 9.5 || 3.8 || 13.4 || 5.3 || 1.7
|-
! scope="row" style="text-align:center" | 2005
|style="text-align:center;"|
| 30 || 24 || 1 || 2 || 251 || 111 || 362 || 146 || 40 || 0.0 || 0.1 || 10.5 || 4.6 || 15.1 || 6.1 || 1.7
|- style="background-color: #EAEAEA"
! scope="row" style="text-align:center" | 2006
|style="text-align:center;"|
| 30 || 20 || 4 || 2 || 237 || 87 || 324 || 109 || 22 || 0.2 || 0.1 || 11.8 || 4.4 || 16.2 || 5.4 || 1.1
|-
! scope="row" style="text-align:center;" | 2007
|style="text-align:center;"|
| 30 || 24 || 1 || 5 || 278	|| 137 || 415 || 111 || 40 || 0.0 || 0.2 || 11.6 || 5.7 || 17.3 || 4.6 || 1.7
|- style="background-color: #EAEAEA"
! scope="row" style="text-align:center" | 2008
|style="text-align:center;"|
| 30 || 22 || 0 || 1 || 200 || 168 || 368 || 75 || 32 || 0.0 || 0.0 || 9.1 || 7.6 || 16.7 || 3.4 || 1.4
|-
! scope="row" style="text-align:center;" | 2009
|style="text-align:center;"|
| 30 || 22 || 0 || 1 || 233 || 174 || 407 || 125 || 32 || 0.0 || 0.0 || 10.6 || 7.9 || 18.5 || 5.7 || 1.4
|- style="background-color: #EAEAEA"
! scope="row" style="text-align:center" | 2010
|style="text-align:center;"|
| 30 || 18 || 0 || 0 || 166 || 151 || 317 || 97 || 30 || 0.0 || 0.0 || 9.2 || 8.4 || 17.6 || 5.4 || 1.7
|-
! scope="row" style="text-align:center;" | 2011
|style="text-align:center;"|
| 30 || 22 || 1 || 1 || 211 || 154 || 365 || 115 || 44 || 0.0 || 0.0 || 9.6 || 7.0 || 16.6 || 5.2 || 2.0
|- style="background-color: #EAEAEA"
! scope="row" style="text-align:center" | 2012
|style="text-align:center;"|
| 30 || 16 || 0 || 0 || 169 || 75 || 244 || 89 || 40 || 0.0 || 0.0 || 10.6 || 4.7 || 15.2 || 5.6 || 2.5
|- class="sortbottom"
! colspan=3| Career
! 284
! 17
! 23
! 2711
! 1497
! 4208
! 1414
! 437
! 0.1
! 0.1
! 9.5
! 5.3
! 14.8
! 5.0
! 1.5
|}

Honours and achievements

Team
AFL Premiership (Geelong): 2007, 2009, 2011
McClelland Trophy (Geelong): 2007, 2008
NAB Cup (Geelong): 2006 (Captain), 2009

Individual
All-Australian: 2003, 2004, 2007, 2008, 2009, 2011
Carji Greeves Medal: 2003
Leigh Matthews Trophy nominee: 2003, 2004, 2005, 2007
Australian representative honours in International rules football: 2002, 2003
Geelong F.C. Hall of Fame Inductee: 2006
Geelong F.C. Life Membership Inductee: 2006
Geelong F.C. Coach's Award: 2000
Victorian Representative Honours in AFL Hall of Fame Tribute Match: 2008
AFL Rising Star Award Nominee: 2000
Victorian Country Representative Honours at the AFL Under 18 Championships: 1997
Named in the TAC Cup Team of the Year: 1997 (Full-Back)

Personal life
Scarlett married his longtime partner Milla Warren in October 2007, which capped off his premiership-winning year and the addition of the couple's first child, a daughter Charlie, to the family in May. Scarlett also has another daughter from a previous relationship with Jodie Nankervis, the daughter of former Geelong player Bruce Nankervis, and is eight years older than Charlie. Scarlett and his family currently reside in the coastal town of Jan Juc, Victoria.

See also
List of Australian rules football families
List of Geelong Football Club individual awards and records

References

External links

1979 births
All-Australians (AFL)
Carji Greeves Medal winners
Geelong Football Club players
Geelong Football Club Premiership players
Geelong Falcons players
Australian people of British descent
St Joseph's Football Club players
South Barwon Football Club players
Australian rules footballers from Geelong
Living people
Australia international rules football team players
Australian Football Hall of Fame inductees
Three-time VFL/AFL Premiership players